Ras Deshen may refer to

The highest mountain of Ethiopia, most often spelled Ras Dashen
The Ras Deshen Ensemble, an Israeli jazz duo named after the mountain